Ralph Frederick "Bouncer" Taylor (October 2, 1905  – July 3, 1976) was a professional ice hockey player who played for 13 seasons. He played for the Chicago Black Hawks and the New York Rangers of the National Hockey League. He coached the St. Louis Flyers in the American Hockey League.

Taylor began his professional career in 1926 with Eddie Livingstone's Chicago Cardinals of the American Hockey Association (AHA). After the team folded in March 1927 due to the competition with the Black Hawks, Taylor moved to the Black Hawks. He played two seasons between the Black Hawks and the New York Rangers. In 1930, he became a member of the Chicago Shamrocks. He would remain in the minor leagues until his retirement in 1941. He had three sons: John Smiley Taylor, Ralph Taylor, and Bill Taylor. He also had two daughters: Marianne Taylor and Teddy Taylor.

External links

1905 births
1976 deaths
Canadian ice hockey defencemen
Chicago Blackhawks players
New York Rangers players
Ice hockey people from Toronto
Canadian expatriate ice hockey players in the United States